"Que Pasa Contigo" is a song by the Italian DJ Alex Gaudino featuring vocals from Sam Obernik. The song was written by Alex Gaudino, Jerma, Sam Obernik and Maurizio Zoffoli. It was released on 12 July 2007. It is the second single released from his debut album My Destination

Track listing

Credits and personnel
Lead vocals – Sam Obernik
Music – Alex Gaudino, Jerma, Sam Obernik, Maurizio Zoffoli
Lyrics – Alex Gaudino, Jerma, Sam Obernik, Maurizio Zoffoli
Prodecer – Alex Gaudino, Jerma
Label: Spinnin' Records

Chart performance

References

2007 singles
Songs written by Alex Gaudino
2007 songs
Spinnin' Records singles
Alex Gaudino songs